Reynella East College (REC), formerly Reynella East Primary & Reynella East High, is a public school for students from Reception to Year 12, located on Malbeck Drive in the southern Adelaide suburb of Reynella East, South Australia. Reynella East College was opened in 2011 after the formal closure of Reynella East Primary and Reynella East High. The Primary section first opened in 1979 ( years ago), while the High School section opened in 1981 ( years ago).

References 

Public schools in South Australia